Maylandia pyrsonotos is a species of cichlid endemic to Lake Malawi where it occurs naturally around Nakatenga Island and has been introduced to the waters around Maleri Island.  This species can reach a length of  SL.  It is also found in the aquarium trade.

References

pyrsonotos
Fish of Malawi
Fish of Lake Malawi
Fish described in 1997
Taxobox binomials not recognized by IUCN 
Taxonomy articles created by Polbot